is a former Japanese professional baseball player.

External links

1974 births
Living people
Baseball people from Sapporo
Tokai University alumni
Japanese baseball players
Nippon Professional Baseball outfielders
Orix BlueWave players
Tohoku Rakuten Golden Eagles players
Japanese baseball coaches
Nippon Professional Baseball coaches